The 1992 season was the 62nd season of competitive football in Ukraine and the first season of fully independent Ukraine following the dissolution of the Soviet Union. This year the Ukrainian Association of Football (as Football Federation of Ukraine) was granted a membership to the international football organizations FIFA and UEFA and allowed to send its clubs to the UEFA continental competitions.

For the first time such former Soviet clubs like FC Dynamo Kyiv and FC Chornomorets Odesa which represented the Soviet Union at European competitions since 1960s qualified for the UEFA competitions representing native Ukrainian nation. For the first time since 1948 FC Dynamo Kyiv returned to compete at the Ukrainian Cup, previously as the Football Cup of the Ukrainian SSR. The champions title of SC Tavriya Simferopol was the first in independent Ukraine and the fourth including competitions of the Football Championship of the Ukrainian SSR.

National team

In 1992, Ukraine national football team conducted its first matches as representatives of now independent Ukraine and FIFA members. The first game was a match between Ukraine and Hungary held on 29 April 1992 at Avanhard Stadium in Uzhhorod, which was the first international home game for Ukraine, saw the first official goal and ended with a 1–3 defeat. The second game in a season took place on 27 June with the United States on away field, and ended in a 0–0 draw, recording a first point for the national team.

Results and fixtures

Domestic leagues

Men

Vyshcha Liha (Top League)

League table

Group A

Group B

Second stage
Championship playoff

Third place playoff

Honors and awards
 Top goalscorer:  Yuri Hudymenko, Tavriya Simferopol (12)
 Ukrainian Footballer of the Year:  Viktor Leonenko, Dynamo Kyiv

Persha Liha (First League)

League table

Group A

Group B

Honors and awards
 Top goalscorer:  Denys Filimonov, Kryvbas Kryvyi Rih (16)

Perekhidna Liha (Transitional League)

League table

Group A

Group B

Women

Vyshcha Liha (Top League)

League table

Honors and awards
 Top goalscorer:  Svitlana Frishko, Dynamo Kyiv (21)

Persha Liha (First League)

Domestic cups

Men

Ukrainian Cup

Main bracket

Final

Women

Ukrainian clubs in international competition

1991–92 European competitions

European Cup

Group stage

Group B

References

External links
Complete results to all national league matches
Ukraine - List of Champions. RSSSF.
Main page. Ukrainian Football from Dmitriy Troschiy. 
1992 Ukraine. RSSSF.

 
Seasons in Ukrainian football